Vladimir Aleksandrovich Sobyanin (13 September 1952 in Sesha village, Dubrovsky District, Bryansk Oblast, Soviet Union) is a Russian/Soviet scientist, PhD, and professor.

Vladimir Sobyanin was born in 1952. In 1969 he graduated from the Physico Mathematical school of Novosibirsk State University. He graduated from the Department of Natural Sciences of Novosibirsk State University in 1974. In 1991 he obtained his PhD.

Sobyanin's scientific activity is closely connected with the Boreskov Institute of Catalysis of the Russian Academy of Sciences. Since 1974 he has worked there as a research engineer, junior and major research assistant, laboratory chief, and as the Deputy Director of Scientific Studies.

Sobyanin held several teaching positions at Novosibirsk State University including Professor, Head of the Department of General Chemistry, and, from 2007 to 2012, Rector. Numerous graduation works and Master's theses were defended under his guidance.
Sobyanin is a well known scientist in the field of catalysis, is the author of more than 210 scientific works as well as 3 surveys, and holds 14 patents.

References

Soviet chemists
Novosibirsk State University alumni
Russian science writers
Academic staff of Novosibirsk State University
People from Bryansk Oblast
1952 births
Living people